Elia Di Giuliomaria (born 12 August 2004) is an Italian football player. He plays for  club Como.

Club career
He made his Serie B debut for Como on 6 May 2022 in a game against Cremonese.

References

External links
 

2004 births
Living people
Italian footballers
Association football defenders
Como 1907 players
Serie B players